Davonte "Devo" Davis (born September 24, 2001) is an American college basketball player for the Arkansas Razorbacks of the Southeastern Conference (SEC).

High school career
As a freshman at Jacksonville Lighthouse School in his hometown of Jacksonville, Arkansas, Davis averaged 16 points and seven rebounds per game, leading his team to a regional championship and the Class 2A state semifinal. In his sophomore season, he averaged 18.4 points, eight assists, seven rebounds and two steals per game. For his junior season, Davis transferred to Jacksonville High School in Jacksonville. He averaged 18.5 points, six assists and 5.3 rebounds per game as a junior. As a senior, Davis averaged 21 points, 10 rebounds, eight assists and three steals per game, helping his team reach the Class 5A state title game, which was canceled due to the COVID-19 pandemic. He was named Arkansas Democrat-Gazette Player of the Year. Davis played for Woodz Elite in the Nike Elite Youth Basketball League circuit. He was regarded as a four-star prospect rated 80th on the ESPN Top 100 and 100th on the 247Sports Composite. He first committed to playing college basketball for Oklahoma State before switching his commitment to Arkansas.

College career
On January 9, 2021, Davis recorded a freshman season-high 20 points, seven rebounds and six assists for Arkansas in a 99–69 win against Georgia. On March 27, he posted 16 points and eight rebounds, including the game-winning shot with 3.1 seconds remaining, in a 72–70 victory over Oral Roberts at the Sweet 16 of the NCAA tournament. As a freshman, Davis averaged 8.5 points, 4.5 rebounds and 2.1 assists per game. He averaged 8.3 points, 3.7 rebounds and 2.8 assists per game as a sophomore, mostly serving as the team's sixth man.

Career statistics

College

|-
| style="text-align:left;"| 2020–21
| style="text-align:left;"| Arkansas
| 30 || 17 || 23.8 || .476 || .154 || .756 || 4.5 || 2.1 || 1.2 || .2 || 8.5
|-
| style="text-align:left;"| 2021–22
| style="text-align:left;"| Arkansas
| 37 || 14 || 27.6 || .429 || .270 || .707 || 3.7 || 2.8 || .9 || .0 || 8.3
|- class="sortbottom"
| style="text-align:center;" colspan="2"| Career
| 67 || 31 || 25.9 || .451 || .253 || .724 || 4.1 || 2.5 || 1.0 || .1 || 8.4

References

External links
Arkansas Razorbacks bio

2001 births
Living people
American men's basketball players
Arkansas Razorbacks men's basketball players
Basketball players from Arkansas
Jacksonville High School (Arkansas) alumni
People from Jacksonville, Arkansas
Point guards
Shooting guards